The 1896 All-Ireland Senior Football Championship was the tenth staging of Ireland's premier Gaelic football knock-out competition. It was the first championship in which a goal was worth three points. Limerick won their second, and so far last, title. In the Munster final they beat Tipperary, the defending champions.

Results

Leinster

The final was abandoned after 50 minutes of play. It was refixed on several occasions but never replayed. On 2 January 1898 Dublin were awarded the Leinster title.

Munster

All-Ireland final

Championship statistics

Miscellaneous
 Limerick win their Munster title and their second ever All Ireland title.

References below

All-Ireland Senior Football Championship